Athletics competitions at the 2005 ALBA Games were held in La Habana, Cuba, between June 23-24, 2005.

A total of 43 events were contested, 22 by men and 21 by women.

Medal summary
Medal winners and their results were published.

Men

Women

Medal table (unofficial)

Participation (unofficial)

 
 México (2)
 Panamá (3)

References

Athletics at the ALBA Games
International athletics competitions hosted by Cuba
ALBA Games
2005 in Cuban sport